G. P. S. de Silva was the 40th Chief Justice of Sri Lanka. He was appointed in 1991 and was Chief Justice until 1999. He was succeeded by Sarath N. Silva.

References

Chief justices of Sri Lanka
Sinhalese judges
20th-century Sri Lankan people
Living people
Year of birth missing (living people)
Alumni of Sri Lanka Law College